In Mandaeism, Qin is the mother of Ruha and Zahreil, and grandmother of Ur in the World of Darkness (alma ḏ-hšuka) or underworld. In Mandaean texts, she is frequently mentioned as the "queen of darkness." One of her epithets is Sumqaq, which also refers to a well of polluted water in the World of Darkness. Her husband is the demon Anathan.

In Book 5 of the Right Ginza, Qin gives her daughter Zahreil for Hibil Ziwa to marry.

References

Demons in Mandaeism